Sentenced to Death is a 1989 Hungarian drama film directed by János Zsombolyai. It was entered into the 40th Berlin International Film Festival.

Cast
 Péter Malcsiner as Gergõ Ferenc
 Barbara Hegyi as Payer Zsuzsa
 István Bubik as Nagy Béla
 Gábor Máté as Wágner Sándor
 Péter Dóczy
 Gábor Kocsó
 Teri Földi as Gergõ édesanyja
 Balázs Tardy
 Miklós Fábián
 Antal Cserna
 Jenõ Kiss
 Erzsi Cserhalmi (as Cserhalmi Erzsébet)
 László Czétényi
 Zoltán Vereczkey

References

External links

1989 films
1989 drama films
1980s Hungarian-language films
Films directed by János Zsombolyai
Hungarian drama films